Sir Thomas Barrett-Lennard, 1st Baronet FSA, DL (6 January 1761 – 25 June 1857) was a British politician and baronet.

He was the illegitimate son of the 17th Baron Dacre and Elizabeth FitzThomas. Barrett-Lennard was educated at Downing College, Cambridge.

He entered the British House of Commons for Essex South in 1832 and was a Member of Parliament (MP) until 1835. Barrett-Lennard was a deputy lieutenant of Essex, and a Fellow of the Society of Antiquaries of London. On 30 June 1801, he was created a baronet, of Belhus, in the County of Essex.

On 15 January 1787, he married firstly Dorothy St Aubyn, daughter of Sir John St Aubyn, 3rd Baronet. She died in 1830, and Barrett-Lennard married secondly Georgina Matilda Stirling, daughter of Sir Walter Stirling, 1st Baronet on 20 June 1833. He had seven sons and four daughters by his first wife as well as one son by his second wife.
Their fifth son, Edward Pomeroy Barrett-Lennard, emigrated to Australia where he established a large estate named after the one on which he had grown up.
Barrett-Lennard died aged 96 and was at this time the most senior member of the baronetage. His oldest son Thomas represented Maldon and having predeceased his father for a year, Barrett-Lennard was succeeded in the baronetcy by his grandson Thomas.

References

External links

1761 births
1857 deaths
Baronets in the Baronetage of the United Kingdom
Deputy Lieutenants of Essex
Fellows of the Society of Antiquaries of London
Members of the Parliament of the United Kingdom for English constituencies
UK MPs 1832–1835
People from Aveley